European Judaism: A Journal for the New Europe is a biannual academic journal published by Berghahn Books in association with the Leo Baeck College and the Michael Goulston Education Foundation. It was established in 1968 and covers Judaism studies concerning Judaism in Europe. The editor-in-chief is Jonathan Magonet.

Abstracting and indexing 
European Judaism is indexed and abstracted in:

External links 
 

Judaic studies journals
Berghahn Books academic journals
Biannual journals
Publications established in 1968
English-language journals
Leo Baeck College